The 2000 FA Women's Cup Final was the 30th final of the FA Women's Cup, England's primary cup competition for women's football teams. It was the seventh final to be held under the direct control of the Football Association (FA). The match was contested by Doncaster Belles and Croydon Women at Bramall Lane in Sheffield on 1 May 2000. Croydon made its third final appearance, after winning in 1996 but losing the 1998 final. Doncaster Belles entered a record 12th final having won the trophy on six previous occasions.

Croydon entered the competition at the fourth round stage and beat Tranmere Rovers, Liverpool, Everton and Leeds United to reach the final. Doncaster Belles also entered at the fourth round and faced Brighton & Hove Albion, Garswood Saints, Wembley Mill Hill and holders Arsenal before reaching the final. Doncaster's 3–2 semi final victory over Arsenal took place at Field Mill before Sky Sports television cameras.

It was reported that Doncaster had been gripped by Cup final excitement after the Belles reached the final for the first time in six years. The club laid on coaches for the short trip to Bramall Lane and an official Cup final song, Northern Pride, was recorded by the team.

Croydon won the match 2–1, with goals from Carmaine Walker and Gemma Hunt. Vicky Exley had equalised for the Belles, while Karen Walker had a penalty kick saved by Croydon goalkeeper Pauline Cope.

Hunt's winning goal was disputed, with Doncaster players arguing the ball had not crossed the goal line.

Match details

References

Cup
Women's FA Cup finals
FA Women's Cup Final, 2000
FA Women's Cup Final, 2000